Pomeroy Cottage is a historic cure cottage located at Saranac Lake, Franklin County, New York.  It was built about 1910 and is a -story, frame dwelling square in shape and covered by a gambrel roof.  It has a small 1-story addition and is-covered in cedar shingles.  It features a cure porch on the second story above the entrance and in a shed roof dormer.

It was listed on the National Register of Historic Places in 1992.

References

Houses on the National Register of Historic Places in New York (state)
Houses completed in 1910
Houses in Franklin County, New York
American Craftsman architecture in New York (state)
National Register of Historic Places in Franklin County, New York